Lidophia graminis, twist fungus, is a fungus found in southern Australia, the Middle East and Europe. Recent research by scientists from Western Australia has found the fungus is capable of controlling organisms that cause the disease of livestock known as annual ryegrass toxicity. An inoculum of the fungus was developed.

References

External links
argt.com.au

Dothideales